Seonghwan Station is a subway station in the province of Chungcheongnam-do. It is located north of Cheonan on the Gyeongbu Line.  It is also served by services on Seoul Subway Line 1.

References

External links
 Station information from Korail

Seoul Metropolitan Subway stations
Railway stations in South Chungcheong Province
Railway stations in Korea opened in 1905
Metro stations in Cheonan